This is a list of Italian television related events from 1967.

Events 

 27 January The young singer-songwriter Luigi Tenco, upset for the failure of his song Ciao, amore, ciao at the Sanremo festival, shoots himself in his hotel room. He leaves behind an accusatory message against the record industry and the mechanism of the contest. RAI tries to minimize the tragedy; the final evening of the show goes on air on schedule. The host Mike Bongiorno only briefly mentions the suicide, not even telling Tenco's name. The festival is won by Claudio Villa, exponent of the most traditional melodic song.

Shows of the year

Drama 

 Tutto Totò – by Daniele D’Anza with Totò; cycle of 9 comic TV-movie, unfinished because the death of the actor. The series, realized hastily, gets a good public success but deludes the critics and the fan of Totò, who here appears underused and far from his best shape.
 Lo schiaccianoci – C’era una volta (The nutcracker – Once upon a time) by Vito Molinari, musical comedy from the Pyotr Ilyich Tchaikovsky's ballet; with Carla Fracci, Giorgio Albertazzi and Renato Rascel.

Miniseries 

 Caravaggio, by Silverio Blasi, with Gian Maria Volonté in the title role, Carla Gravina and Renzo Palmer; in 3 episodes.
 I promessi sposi (The betrothed), by Sandro Bolchi, from the Alessandro Manzoni's novel, script by Riccardo Bacchelli, with two young actors coming from the new-wave cinema (Nino Castelnuovo and Paola Pitagora) as the two protagonists and a stellar cast in the minor roles (Tino Carraro, Luigi Vannucchi, Massimo Girotti, Lea Massari, Salvo Randone and Giancarlo Sbragia as the teller); in 8 episodes. Scrupulously faithful to the original text, it's one of the Italian TV-novels most ambitious and most appreciated by public and critics.
 La fiera delle vanità (Vanity fair) – by Anton Giulio Majano, from the William Makepeace Thackeray's novel, with Adriana Asti and Ilaria Occhini; in 7 episodes.
 Vita di Cavour (Life of Cavour) – by Piero Schivazappa, with Renzo Palmer, script by Giorgio Prosperi; in 4 episodes.

Serials 

 Sheridan, squadra omicidi (Sheridan homicide squad) by Leonardo Cortese, with Ubaldo Lay as the Lieutenant Sheridan of the San Francisco Police Department.
I racconti del faro (The lighthouse’s tales) – by Angelo D’Alessandro, with Fosco Giachetti and Roberto Chevalier; sea adventures in 6 episodes, for children.

Variety 

 Il tappabuchi (The stopgaps) – by Vito Molinari, with Corrado Mantoni and Raimondo Vianello, in 8 episodes; mix of comic sketches, dance, quiz and candid cameras realized by Nanny Loy.
Musica da sera (Evening music) – by Enzo Trapani, with Lisa Gastoni and Mascia Cantoni.
Diamoci del tu (Don't be formal) – by Romolo Siena, musical show aimed to the young ones, hosted by Caterina Caselli and Giorgio Gaber; debut in TV of Francesco Guccini and Franco Battiato.
Scarpette rosa (Pink shoes) – tribute show to Carla Fracci, in form of an enquiry by a female reporter (Lina Volonghi).

News and educational 

 La via del petrolio (The way of the petroleum) - by Bernardo Bertolucci, produced by ENI; 3 episodes.

References 

1967 in Italian television